This is a list of the dung beetle and chafer (Scarabaeoidea) species recorded in Great Britain. For other beetles, see List of beetles of Great Britain.

Family Lucanidae Latreille, 1804
Sinodendron cylindricum (Linnaeus, 1758)
Lucanus cervus (Linnaeus, 1758)
Platycerus caraboides (Linnaeus, 1758)
Dorcus parallelipipedus (Linnaeus, 1758)
Family Trogidae MacLeay, 1819
Trox perlatus (Goeze, 1777)
Trox sabulosus (Linnaeus, 1758)
Trox scaber (Linnaeus, 1767)
Family Bolboceratidae Mulsant, 1842
Odonteus armiger (Scopoli, 1772)
Family Geotrupidae Latreille, 1802
Typhaeus typhoeus (Linnaeus, 1758)
Anoplotrupes stercorosus (Scriba, 1791)
Geotrupes mutator (Marsham, 1802)
Geotrupes spiniger (Marsham, 1802)
Geotrupes stercorarius (Linnaeus, 1758)
Trypocopris pyrenaeus (Charpentier, 1825)
Trypocopris vernalis (Linnaeus, 1758)
Family Scarabaeidae Latreille, 1802
Aegialia arenaria (Fabricius, 1787)
Aegialia insularis Pittino, 2006
Aegialia rufa (Fabricius, 1792)
Aphodius depressus (Kugelann, 1792)
Aphodius luridus (Fabricius, 1775) ?
Aphodius rufipes (Linnaeus, 1758)
Aphodius lapponum Gyllenhal, 1808
Aphodius nemoralis Erichson, 1848
Aphodius ater (De Geer, 1774)
Aphodius constans Duftschmid, 1805
Aphodius rufus (Moll, 1782)
Aphodius sordidus (Fabricius, 1775)
Aphodius brevis Erichson, 1848
Aphodius fimetarius (Linnaeus, 1758)
Aphodius foetens (Fabricius, 1787)
Aphodius foetidus (Herbst, 1783)
Aphodius pedellus (De Geer, 1774)
Aphodius ictericus (Laicharting, 1781)
Aphodius granarius (Linnaeus, 1767)
Aphodius conspurcatus (Linnaeus, 1758)
Aphodius distinctus (O. F. Müller, 1776)
Aphodius paykulli Bedel, 1907
Aphodius erraticus (Linnaeus, 1758)
Aphodius merdarius (Fabricius, 1775)
Aphodius pusillus (Herbst, 1789)
Aphodius coenosus (Panzer, 1798)
Aphodius subterraneus (Linnaeus, 1758)
Aphodius lividus (Olivier, 1789)
Aphodius zenkeri Germar, 1813
Aphodius niger (Illiger, 1798)
Aphodius plagiatus (Linnaeus, 1767)
Aphodius consputus Creutzer, 1799
Aphodius prodromus (Brahm, 1790)
Aphodius punctatosulcatus Sturm, 1805
Aphodius sphacelatus (Panzer, 1798)
Aphodius contaminatus (Herbst, 1783)
Aphodius obliteratus Sturm, 1823
Aphodius haemorrhoidalis (Linnaeus, 1758)
Aphodius quadrimaculatus (Linnaeus, 1761)
Aphodius arenarius (Olivier, 1789)
Aphodius borealis Gyllenhal, 1827
Aphodius fasciatus (Olivier, 1789)
Aphodius porcus (Fabricius, 1792)
Aphodius fossor (Linnaeus, 1758)
Aphodius sticticus (Panzer, 1798)
Euheptaulacus sus (Herbst, 1783)
Euheptaulacus villosus (Gyllenhal in Schönherr, 1806)
Heptaulacus testudinarius (Fabricius, 1775)
Oxyomus sylvestris (Scopoli, 1763)
Saprosites mendax (Blackburn, 1892)
Saprosites natalensis (Peringuey, 1901)
Brindalus porcicollis (Illiger, 1803)
Diastictus vulneratus (Sturm, 1805)
Psammodius asper (Fabricius, 1775)
Tesarius caelatus (LeConte, 1857)
Tesarius mcclayi (Cartwright, 1955)
Pleurophorus caesus (Creutzer in Panzer, 1796)
Rhyssemus germanus (Linnaeus, 1767)
Copris lunaris (Linnaeus, 1758)
Onthophagus taurus (Schreber, 1759)
Onthophagus coenobita (Herbst, 1783)
Onthophagus fracticornis (Preyssler, 1790)
Onthophagus joannae Goljan, 1953
Onthophagus nuchicornis (Linnaeus, 1758)
Onthophagus similis (Scriba, 1790)
Onthophagus vacca (Linnaeus, 1767)
Onthophagus verticicornis (Laicharting, 1781)
Hoplia philanthus (Füessly, 1775)
Melolontha hippocastani Fabricius, 1801
Melolontha melolontha (Linnaeus, 1758)
Polyphylla fullo (Linnaeus, 1758)
Amphimallon ochraceum (Knoch, 1801)
Amphimallon solstitiale (Linnaeus, 1758)
Omaloplia ruricola (Fabricius, 1775) ?
Serica brunnea (Linnaeus, 1758)
Anomala dubia (Scopoli, 1763)
Phyllopertha horticola (Linnaeus, 1758) ?
Cetonia aurata (Linnaeus, 1758)
Protaetia metallica (Herbst, 1782)
Gnorimus nobilis (Linnaeus, 1758)
Gnorimus variabilis (Linnaeus, 1758)
Trichius fasciatus (Linnaeus, 1758)
Trichius rosaceus (Voët, 1769)

References

Dung beetles and chafers